The 2012 Nuclear Security Summit was a summit held at the COEX Convention & Exhibition Center in Seoul, South Korea, on March 26 and 27, 2012. It was the second time the conference was held after the 2010 Nuclear Security Summit.

The summit series discusses international cooperative measures to protect nuclear materials and facilities from terrorist groups. Fifty-eight world leaders from 53 states and four international organizations, including the United Nations, International Atomic Energy Agency, the European Union and INTERPOL, participated. The main issues discussed were:
Cooperative measures to combat the threat of nuclear terrorism
Protection of nuclear materials and related facilities
Prevention of illicit trafficking of nuclear materials

At the summit, the leaders discussed nuclear terrorism threats and nuclear security preparedness. They also reviewed the implementation of agreements and voluntary commitments. Then the leaders focused on major nuclear security issues, mostly brought up at the Washington summit, such as the minimization and management of highly enriched uranium, ratification of nuclear security conventions, strengthening information and transportation security, IAEA’s role, preventing illicit nuclear trafficking, nuclear security culture, and international cooperation and assistance.

In the aftermath of the March 2011 Fukushima nuclear disaster, Korea added a new issues of radiological security and the nuclear security-safety interface to the agenda from the natural disasters since World War II (1939-45) and Korean War (1950-53). The Washington summit had focused on nuclear terrorism with explosive nuclear devices, perceiving that as the biggest threat to international security after 9/11 attacks in New York City in 2001, 3/11 train bombings in Madrid in 2004, and 7/7 bombings in London in 2005. The 2012 Seoul Nuclear Security summit also discussed protection against dirty bombs and the sabotage of nuclear facilities.

Some states opposed the two new items, saying that they would dilute the focus of the summit.

Background
The first Nuclear Security Summit was held in Washington D.C., U.S.A. on April 12-13, 2010. U.S. President Barack Obama, who proposed the Nuclear Security Summit in his April 2009 Prague speech, invited 47 heads of government and heads of states and three representatives of international organizations. In the Prague speech, President Obama announced his vision for a ‘world without nuclear weapons’ and proposed nuclear security as one of three strategic goals for this vision together with nuclear disarmament and nonproliferation. President Obama also announced a nuclear security goal to secure all vulnerable nuclear materials around the world in four years.

During the Washington summit, Korea was proposed as the second summit host by President Obama, which was accepted.

Participants

Schedule and agenda

After a reception, on March 27 there was a Morning Session, a Working Luncheon and an Afternoon Session.

The agenda for each session was as follows: 

1. March 26 (Monday)
-Working Dinner :  Review of the Progress Made Since the 2010 Washington Summit
2. March 27 (Tuesday)      
-Plenary Session I : National Measures and International Cooperation to Enhance Nuclear Security, including Future Commitments
-Working Lunch :   Nuclear Security-Safety Interface
-Plenary Session II : National Measures and International Cooperation to Enhance Nuclear Security, including Future 
Commitments (cont.).

Seoul Communiqué
The Seoul Communiqué built on the objectives and measures set out in the 2010 Washington Communiqué to identify 11 areas of priority and importance in nuclear security and presents specific actions in each area. 

The 11 areas are as follows: the global nuclear security architecture; the role of the IAEA; nuclear materials; radioactive sources; nuclear security and safety; transportation security; combating illicit trafficking; nuclear forensics; nuclear security culture; information security; and international cooperation. 

The Seoul Communiqué sets out the following specific actions in the above 11 areas:

Eliminating and disposing of highly enriched uranium (HEU) no longer in use
Minimizing the use of HEU
Encouraging voluntary announcements by the end of 2013 of specific actions to minimize the use of HEU
Welcoming international efforts to develop high-density low-enriched uranium (LEU) fuel for the purpose of replacing HEU fuels in research reactors and medical isotope production facilities
Seeking to bring the 2005 amended Convention on the Physical Protection of Nuclear Materials (CPPNM) into effect by 2014
Welcoming an international conference in 2013 organized by the IAEA to coordinate nuclear security activities
Encouraging voluntary contributions to the IAEA Nuclear Security Fund
Developing options for national policies on HEU management within the framework of the IAEA
Encouraging national measures and international cooperation to prevent radiological terrorism
Strengthening the physical protection of nuclear facilities and enhancing  emergency response capabilities in the case of radiological accidents while comprehensively addressing nuclear security and nuclear safety concerns
Strengthening the management of spent nuclear fuels and radioactive wastes
Strengthening the protection of nuclear materials and radioactive sources in transport
Encouraging the establishment of a system to effectively manage and track such materials on a national level
Preventing the illicit trafficking of nuclear materials 
Strengthening technical capabilities to search for and detect illicitly trafficked nuclear materials and encouraging the sharing of information on persons involved in such activities by cooperating with the INTERPOL
Building nuclear forensics capacity to identify the source of illicitly trafficked nuclear materials
Welcoming the establishment of Centers of Excellence for training and education in nuclear security, and supporting networking activities between each Center
Strengthening the nuclear security culture
Encouraging the participation of industry, academia, the media, NGOs and other civil actors in the discussions on nuclear security
Strengthening the protection of sensitive nuclear security-related information and enhancing cyber security at nuclear facilities 
Promoting international cooperation, such as the provision of assistance to countries for the enhancement of national nuclear security capabilities upon request
The hosting of the next Nuclear Security Summit in the Netherlands — see 2014 Nuclear Security Summit

The Seoul Communiqué provides important timelines for advancing nuclear security objectives, such as the target year (end of 2013) for states to announce voluntary actions on minimizing the use of HEU and the goal year (2014) for bringing the amended CPPNM into effect. It reflects the need to address both the issues of nuclear security and nuclear safety in a coherent manner for the sustainable peaceful uses of nuclear energy. It also emphasizes the need to better secure spent nuclear fuel and radioactive waste. It also sets out specific measures to prevent radiological terrorism, an issue only briefly touched upon at the Washington Summit.

See also
Barack Obama speech in Prague, 2009
Global Initiative to Combat Nuclear Terrorism
Nuclear disarmament
New START
Nuclear proliferation
Proliferation Security Initiative

References

External links

After the Summit: Investing in Nuclear Materials Security by Christopher P. Twomey (April 2012)
2012 Nuclear Security Summit: The Korean Twist  by Duyeon Kim (September 2011)
2012 Nuclear Security Summit and South Korean Nuclear Interests by Fred McGoldrick (March 2012)
From Washington to Seoul: Advancing Nuclear Security Objectives by Olexander Motsyk(May 2012)

Nuclear proliferation
Nuclear weapons policy
Nuclear Security Summit, 2012
Nuclear Security Summit, 2012
Nuclear Security Summit, 2012
Nuclear Security Summit, 2012
Nuclear Security Summit, 2012
2010s in Seoul
March 2012 events in South Korea